The Revolutionary Hydra were an indie rock band on Barsuk Records based in Washington. It had a rotating cast of members, including Bart Sharp, Joe Chilcote, Jay Chilcote, Benjamin Gibbard (of Death Cab for Cutie), Chris Walla (also of Death Cab for Cutie), Allisyn Levy, Robbie Skrocki, Nathan Good, and Herbert Bergel.

Discography
Albums
 The Left-Handed Scissors Incident (1997)
 Pacer v. The Revolutionary Hydra (1997) split with Pacer
 Hiss Inclusive (1998)
 Tidbits of Etcetra (1998)
 Ratcheting Down the Melancholic Afterbeat; A Novel (1999)
 The Antiphony (2001)
 Knockout to Dispense (2002)
 The PEEFs (2003)
EPs
 Your Bruise (1998) split with Death Cab for Cutie
 The Swiss Admiral E.P. (2001)
Singles
 "Queen of the Gravity Urge" (2000)
 "Airport Transit Guide" (2002)

References

Indie rock musical groups from Washington (state)
Barsuk Records artists